The ARIA Digital Track Chart is a chart that ranks the best-performing digital tracks singles of Australia. It is published by Australian Recording Industry Association (ARIA), an organisation who collect music data for the weekly ARIA Charts.
To be eligible to appear on the chart, the recording must be a single not an EP and only paid downloads counted from downloadable outlets.

Chart history

Number-one artists

See also
2011 in music

References

Australia Digital Songs
2011 in Australian music
Digital 2011